Nemastoma bimaculatum is a species of harvestman, in the Nemastomatidae. It is black, with two cream spots on the cephalothorax (rarely all black). It is sometimes known as N. lugubre. It occurs in Britain, Ireland, France, Germany, and Spain.

References 

Harvestmen
Arachnids of Europe